A list of films produced in the Soviet Union between 1980 and 1991:

List of Soviet films of 1980
List of Soviet films of 1981
List of Soviet films of 1982
List of Soviet films of 1983
List of Soviet films of 1984
List of Soviet films of 1985
List of Soviet films of 1986
List of Soviet films of 1987
List of Soviet films of 1988
List of Soviet films of 1989
List of Soviet films of 1990
List of Soviet films of 1991

References

1980-1991
Lists of 1980s films
Films
Lists of 1990s films
Films